Afrithelphusa is a genus of freshwater crabs in the family Deckeniidae. It contains four species, all of which were formerly listed as critically endangered by the International Union for Conservation of Nature (IUCN). They are all endemic to the Upper Guinean forests of Guinea and Sierra Leone.

Afrithelphusa afzelii
Afrithelphusa afzelii (Colosi, 1924) is known from two specimens collected before 1800 from a single, unknown locality in Sierra Leone. It is considered possibly extinct.

Afrithelphusa gerhildae
Afrithelphusa gerhildae (Bott, 1969) is known from three specimens collected in 1957 in Kindia, Guinea. Although population sizes are not known, the expansion of slash and burn agriculture and deforestation are likely to have caused it to decline. The lack of information about this species has led to its reappraisal as Data Deficient.

Afrithelphusa leonensis
Afrithelphusa leonensis (Cumberlidge, 1987) is known from three specimens collected in 1955 at one locality in Guinea. It is considered critically endangered. The crab is among the 25 "lost species" that will be surveyed in the "Search for Lost Species" program by the non-profit organization Global Wildlife Conservation (GWC). In 2021, the species was rediscovered in Moyamba District by Pierre A. Mvogo Ndongo, a researcher from the University of Douala.

Afrithelphusa monodosa
Afrithelphusa monodosa (Bott, 1959), the purple marsh crab, is the best known of the four species, new populations having been discovered since 1996. Despite this, fewer than 20 specimens have been collected, and the total population is likely to be less than 2,500. This crab is now listed as endangered.

References

External links

Potamoidea
Freshwater crustaceans of Africa
Crustacean genera
Taxonomy articles created by Polbot